The Swift S-1 is a single seat aerobatic glider manufactured by Polish company Swift Ltd.

Design and development
Edward Margański, Jerzy Cisowski and Jerzy Makula developed the Swift at Bielsko-Biała from the SZD-21-2b Kobuz 3. The prototype first flew in 1991.

The glider is made of glass-fibre epoxy composite. It is very strong (stressed for plus and minus 10g) and manoeuvrable (a roll takes less than 4 seconds). Larger tips to increase the span to 15m were designed but not made. It has a retractable undercarriage.

Specifications

Gallery

Comparable aircraft
Celair GA-1 Celstar
MDM-1 Fox
PZL Bielsko SZD-59

References

External links
 GoPro Hero 2 Swift S-1 2012 by Luca Bertossio in 3D

Glider aircraft
1990s Polish sailplanes
Articles containing video clips
Aircraft first flown in 1991